Pesum Deivam is a 1967 Indian Tamil-language drama film, directed by K. S. Gopalakrishnan and produced by R. Balasubramaniam. The film stars Sivaji Ganesan, Padmini, S. V. Ranga Rao and S. V. Sahasranamam. It was released on 14 April 1967.

Plot 

Lakshmi, after marrying Chandru, yearns for a child. Barren for a long time, they make special arrangements with their maid to adopt her unborn child. But their happiness is short-lived when the newborn baby dies. Their sadness is overtaken soon, when Lakshmi becomes pregnant. The child is born and is healthy. Does Lakshmi's wants end there? No, the child has a special problem.... and the wants continue.

Cast 
Sivaji Ganesan as Chandru
Padmini as Lakshmi
S. V. Ranga Rao as Thiruvenkadam
M. S. Sundari Bai as Ammani
S. V. Sahasranamam as Collector Sundaram
V. S. Raghavan as Doctor
Nagesh as Murali
Sathyan
Sowcar Janaki
Jayabharathi as Suganthi
Baby Rani as Babu
Samikannu as Lakshmi's grandfather
K. Kannan as Lakshmi's uncle
Veerasamy
G. Sakunthala as Velammal

Soundtrack 
The music was composed by K. V. Mahadevan, with lyrics by Vaali. The song "Nooraandu Kaalam Vaazhga" became popular, and is frequently performed at various events in Tamil Nadu, such as birthday parties and marriages. The song "Azhagu Deivam" is set to Kanada raga.

Reception 
Kalki positively reviewed the film for Ganesan and Padmini's performances, and the music.

References

Bibliography

External links 
 

1960s Tamil-language films
1967 drama films
1967 films
Films directed by K. S. Gopalakrishnan
Films scored by K. V. Mahadevan
Films with screenplays by K. S. Gopalakrishnan
Indian drama films